Herrington Manor State Park is a public recreation area on  in Garrett County, Maryland. The focal point of the state park is  Herrington Lake. Both parks are managed by the Maryland Department of Natural Resources.

History
The park is named for the manor house built by real estate investor Abijah Herrington in the mid-1800s. The property was purchased by the state in 1935 as part of state forest development. The Civilian Conservation Corps subsequently dammed Herrington Creek to create the park's  lake. In 1964, the manor house was demolished and Herrington Manor State Park was established.

Activities and amenities
The park offers swimming, fishing, boating, twelve miles of hiking and biking trails, and rental cabins.

References

External links
Herrington Manor State Park Maryland Department of Natural Resources

State parks of Maryland
Parks in Garrett County, Maryland
Civilian Conservation Corps in Maryland
Protected areas established in 1964
1964 establishments in Maryland